John Charles Butcher  (born 31 March 1933) is a New Zealand mathematician who specialises in numerical methods for the solution of ordinary differential equations.

Butcher works on multistage methods for initial value problems, such as Runge-Kutta and general linear methods. The Butcher group and the Butcher tableau are named after him.
More recently, he is investigating a new type of method with stability identical to that of a Runge-Kutta method.

Biography

Butcher studied mathematics at Auckland University College - BSc and MSc  - and the University of Sydney - PhD (1961) and DSc. 
Positions held are as aside.

He was awarded the Jones Medal from the Royal Society of New Zealand in 2010, for his "exceptional lifetime work on numerical methods for the solution of differential equations and leadership in the development of New Zealand mathematical sciences."  In 2011 he received the Van Wijngaarden Award.

In the 2013 Queen's Birthday Honours, Butcher was appointed an Officer of the New Zealand Order of Merit, for services to mathematics.

Publications
.
.
 John C. Butcher: "Trees, B-series and exponential integrators", IMA Journal of Numerical Analysis Vol.30,No.1(Jan. 2010),pp. 131–140. DOI:10.1093/imanum/drn086 .
.
 J.C.Butcher:"Trees and B-series", Numerical Algorithms (2019), vol.81, pp. 1311–1325. https://doi.org/10.1007/s11075-018-0643-7
 John C. Butcher: "B-Series : Algebraic Analysis of Numerical Methods", Springer(SSCM, volume 55), ISBN 978-3030709556 (April, 2021).

References

External links

 Auckland Home page
 Personal Home page
 Homepage of John C. Butcher

1933 births
Living people
New Zealand computer scientists
Numerical analysts
Academic staff of the University of Auckland
Academic staff of the University of Canterbury
Academic staff of the University of Sydney
Fellows of the Society for Industrial and Applied Mathematics
Officers of the New Zealand Order of Merit
20th-century New Zealand mathematicians
21st-century New Zealand mathematicians